Longa Island  (Gaelic: Longa) is a small uninhabited island at the mouth of Loch Gairloch, on the west coast of Scotland.

Geology
The island is mainly sandstone covered with grass and heather.

Economy
In the early nineteenth century, there was a small fishing community, but by the late nineteenth century, the island had become deserted. Today only sheep graze the island in the summer months.

Notes and references

Former populated places in Scotland
Uninhabited islands of Highland (council area)